Orkland is a municipality in Trøndelag county, Norway. It is located in the traditional district of Orkdalen. The administrative centre of the municipality is the town of Orkanger.  Other notable population centres in the municipality include Krokstadøra, Selbekken, Ingdalen, Lensvik, Vassbygda, Vernes, Leksa, Kjøra, Geitastrand, Gjølme, Thamshavn, Fannrem, Vormstad, Svorkmo, Hoston, village of Meldal, Løkken Verk, Bjørnli, Å, and Storås.

The  municipality is the 42nd largest by area out of the 356 municipalities in Norway. Orkland is the 71st most populous municipality in Norway with a population of 18,502.

General information
The municipality of Orkland was established on 1 January 2020 after the merger of the old municipalities of Agdenes, Orkdal, Meldal, and most of Snillfjord.

Name
The name of the municipality comes from the name of the local river Orkla and the Orkladalen valley in which the river runs. There was another municipality of Orkland that existed from 1920 until 1963, and its area will be part of the new (much larger) municipality.

Coat of arms
The coat of arms for the municipality was approved in 2019. It is somewhat of a combination of the old arms for Meldal and Orkdal. The arms are divided horizontally by a wavy line with green above and silver below representing agriculture and forestry (green) and the sea and water (silver). In the centre of the arms there is a gear which represents the industry of the community. The colors of the gear are inverted from the background.

Churches
The Church of Norway had eight parishes within the municipality of Orkland. It is part of the Orkdal prosti (deanery) in the Diocese of Nidaros.

Government
All municipalities in Norway, including Orkland, are responsible for primary education (through 10th grade), outpatient health services, senior citizen services, unemployment and other social services, zoning, economic development, and municipal roads. The municipality is governed by a municipal council of elected representatives, which in turn elects a mayor.  The municipality falls under the Sør-Trøndelag District Court and the Frostating Court of Appeal.

Municipal council
The municipal council  of Orkland is made up of 51 representatives that are elected to four year terms. The party breakdown of the council is as follows:

Notable people 
 Håkon Hoff (1898 in Orkanger – 1976) a Norwegian newspaper editor and politician
 Peter Deinboll DSO, MC (1915–1944) a Norwegian engineer, and resistance member during WWII; grew up in Orkanger
 Synnøve Gleditsch (1908–1980), an actress from Agdenes
 Kurt Mosbakk (born 1934) a Norwegian politician, went to school in Orkanger

References

 
Municipalities of Trøndelag
2020 establishments in Norway
Populated places established in 2020